The Pannerdens Kanaal (Pannerden Canal) is a canal in the Netherlands that was dredged between 1701 and 1709 to cut off a large, shallow bend of the river Rhine and so improve river traffic and water regulation.

The canal, now indistinguishable from a "real" river, forks off north from river Waal a few kilometres past the point where the Bijlands Kanaal, a similar canal dug to cut off a Waal bend, ends. It flows past the towns of Pannerden (right bank), which gives the canal its name, and Angeren (left bank) and so north to the point where the old Rhine bend flows into it and the river continues to the sea as Nederrijn (Lower Rhine). The old Rhine bend, cut off at its upstream end, still exists and is called, unsurprisingly, Oude Rijn (Old Rhine).

Canals in the Rhine–Meuse–Scheldt delta
Canals opened in 1709
1709 establishments in the Dutch Republic
Canals in the Netherlands
Canals in Gelderland
Lingewaard
Zevenaar
18th-century architecture in the Netherlands